Limmared is a locality situated in Tranemo Municipality, Västra Götaland County, Sweden with 1,412 inhabitants in 2010.

Points of interest
Limmareds glasbruk, Sweden's oldest functioning glassworks is located in Limmared. It was founded in 1740. Its most famous product is Absolute Vodka bottle.

References 

Populated places in Västra Götaland County
Populated places in Tranemo Municipality